The Soviet Railways (Russian: Советские железные дороги (СЖД)) was the state owned national railway system of the Soviet Union, headquartered in Moscow. The railway started operations in December 1922, shortly after the formation of the Soviet Union. Soviet Railways greatly upgraded and expanded the Russian Imperial Railways to meet the demands of the new country. It operated until the dissolution of the Soviet Union in December 1991.

The Soviet Railways were the largest unified railway in the world and the backbone of the Soviet Union's economy. The railway was directly under the control of the Ministry of Railways in the Soviet Union.

After the dissolution of the Soviet Union, Soviet Railways split into fifteen different national railways belonging to the respective countries. However, after the end of Soviet Railways, rail transport in the former Soviet states greatly declined and have not recovered to their former efficiency to this day. By mileage, Russian Railways was the primary successor of Soviet Railways. Newly-independent countries following the breakup, such as those in Central Asia, inherited the Soviet infrastructure.

Successor railways

See also
Rail transport in the Soviet Union
Russian Railways
History of rail transport in Russia
Transport in the Soviet Union
Industrial railway
Sibirjak
Russian Railway Museum, in Saint Petersburg, which is home to former Soviet locomotives and other machinery.

References

Further reading

Rail transport in the Soviet Union